The following lists the top 25 singles of 2016 in Australia from the Australian Recording Industry Association (ARIA) end-of-year singles chart.

The Chainsmokers’ track "Closer", featuring Halsey, was the highest selling single in Australia in 2016 with a sales accreditation of seven times platinum. It spent nine weeks at number one.

"Never Be like You" by Flume featuring Kai was the highest selling Australian song.

See also
List of number-one singles of 2016 (Australia)
List of Australian chart achievements and milestones

References

Australian record charts
2016 in Australian music
Australia Top 25 Singles